Mikhail Kukushkin was the defending champion; however, he didn't take part in these championships this year.
Ivo Minář defeated Santiago Ventura in the final (6–4, 6–3).

Seeds

Draw

Final four

Top half

Bottom half

References

External links
 Main Draw
 Qualifying Draw

Open Barletta - Citta della Disfida - Singles
2009 Singles